Glubokoye Lake is a small lake situated just east of Lake Lagernoye and Molodyozhnaya Station in the Thala Hills of Enderby Land, Antarctica. It was mapped and named "Glubokoye ozero" (deep lake) by the Soviet Antarctic Expedition, 1961–62.

References

Lakes of Antarctica
Bodies of water of Enderby Land